Golden Eagles FC was a Statia association football club based in Oranjestad. The club is historically known as one of the most successful clubs in the Sint Eustatius League, having two known titles.

Honors 
 Sint Eustatius League: 2
1983, 1984

References 

Football clubs in Sint Eustatius
1980s disestablishments in the Netherlands Antilles